Boogaerts is a surname. Notable people with the surname include:

Frank Boogaerts (born 1944), Belgian politician
Mathieu Boogaerts (born 1970), French singer-songwriter